Ryerson is a surname.

Ryerson may also refer to:

Place
 Ryerson, Ontario, Canada; a township in Parry Sound District
 Ryerson, Algoma District, Ontario, Canada; an unincorporated place
 Ryerson, Saskatchewan, Canada; an unincorporated place in Maryfield Rural Municipality
 Ryerson's Island, Ontario, Canada; an island in Lake Erie
 Edward L. Ryerson Conservation Area, Riverwoods, Illinois, USA
 Ryerson Station State Park, Richhill Township, Greene County, Pennsylvania, USA

Facilities and structures
 Ryerson Physical Laboratory, University of Chicago, Chicago, Illinois, USA
 Ryerson Library, the older wing of the main public library in Grand Rapids, Michigan, United States
 Martin Ryerson Tomb (Ryerson Tomb), Graceland Cemetery, Chicago, Illinois, USA

Other
 Ryerson, Inc., a metals distributor
 Ryerson Press, Canadian book publisher
 Ryerson Fiction Award, a Canadian literary award
 Ryerson Radio of Ryerson University
 Ryerson University, formerly Ryerson Polytechnic a public university in Toronto, Canada; that was renamed to Toronto Metropolitan University in 2022
  (aka SS Ryerson), a U.S. Great Lakes freighter

See also